This is a list of Portuguese comedians sorted by last name:

David Cristina
Marco Horácio
Herman José
Nuno Markl
Bruno Nogueira
Ricardo Araújo Pereira
Fernando Rocha
Raúl Solnado

See also
 List of comedians
 List of Portuguese people

Portuguese
Comedians
 List